Beaches—East York is a provincial riding in Toronto, Ontario, Canada. It elects one member to the Legislative Assembly of Ontario. It was created in 1996 from parts of Beaches—Woodbine (95%), Don Mills (40%), and York East (20%).

When the riding was created, it included the former borough of East York east of Coxwell Avenue and that part of Old Toronto east of a line following Coxwell to Gerrard Street to Greenwood Avenue to Queen Street to Leslie Street. In 2007, the boundaries were altered so that everything west of Coxwell Avenue was transferred to Toronto—Danforth.

Boundaries
In 1996, much of the province's old boundaries were redrawn due to the Fewer Politicians Act which reduced the number of seats in the legislature from 130 to 103 to match the number of federal seats.

The boundary of the new riding of Beaches-East York, beginning at the southwest corner starts where the southern extension of Leslie Street intersects with Lake Ontario, proceeds north along Leslie Street, then east along Queen Street East, north along Greenwood Avenue, east along Gerrard Street East, and north along Coxwell Avenue until it turns into Coxwell Blvd. at O'Connor Drive. It continues a short distance along this street where the boundary extends until it meets Taylor-Massey Creek. It follows the creek west (downstream) until it meets the Don River East Branch. The boundary follows the river northeast (upstream) until it meets the point where a westerly extension of Sunrise Avenue intersects with the river course. The boundary continues east along Sunrise Avenue until it meets Victoria Park Avenue. The boundary turns south and follows the street south until it ends at Lake Ontario. The boundary follows the lake coast back west until it meets the beginning point.

In 2003, the western boundary was altered so that the portion west of Coxwell Avenue was transferred to the neighbouring riding of Toronto—Danforth.

Members of Provincial Parliament

Election results

2007 electoral reform referendum

 This riding was one of five ridings where a majority of voters supported MMP.

References

External links

Provincial electoral districts of Toronto